Byssoloma spinulosum is a species of lichen in the family Pilocarpaceae. Found in the Northern Province of Papua New Guinea, it was described as new to science in 2011.

References

Pilocarpaceae
Lichen species
Lichens described in 2011
Lichens of New Guinea
Taxa named by Emmanuël Sérusiaux